Minvydas Packevičius (born May 3, 1979) is a Lithuanian former swimmer, who specialized in sprint freestyle events. Packevicius competed for Lithuania in the 4×100 m freestyle relay at the 2000 Summer Olympics in Sydney. Teaming with Arūnas Savickas, Saulius Binevičius, and Rolandas Gimbutis in heat two, Packevicius swam the second leg and recorded a split of 50.53, but the Lithuanians settled only for sixth place and sixteenth overall in a final time of 3:23.68.

References

1979 births
Living people
Lithuanian male freestyle swimmers
Olympic swimmers of Lithuania
Swimmers at the 2000 Summer Olympics
Sportspeople from Vilnius